Berdmore is a surname and may refer one of the following individuals:

 Samuel Berdmore (died 1742/3), English clergyman
 Samuel Berdmore (schoolmaster) (1739–1802), English headmaster
 Scrope Berdmore (1708–1770), English clergyman
 Scrope Berdmore (academic) (1744–1814), English academic, Warden of Merton College, Oxford
 Thomas Berdmore (c.1740–1785), English dentist to King George III

See also
 Berdmore's Ground Squirrel (Menetes berdmorei), a ground squirrel found in Southeast Asia.